Thomas McDermott may refer to:

 Thomas McDermott Jr. (born 1969), mayor of Hammond, Indiana
 Tom McDermott (musician) (born 1957), American jazz pianist
 Tom McDermott (Big Brother), contestant on the first series of Big Brother in the UK
 Tom McDermott (engineer), American academic
 Tommy McDermott (1878–1961), Scottish footballer
 Thomas MacDermot (1870–1933), Jamaican writer